Kevin Mather (born August 25, 1982) is an American Paralympic archer and former para-alpine skier. He won gold in the men's individual recurve open at the 2020 Summer Paralympics in Tokyo.

References

External links
 
 

1982 births
Living people
American male archers
American male alpine skiers
Paralympic archers of the United States
Paralympic gold medalists for the United States
Paralympic medalists in archery
Archers at the 2020 Summer Paralympics
Medalists at the 2020 Summer Paralympics
Sportspeople from Santa Clarita, California
21st-century American people